Fifth Avenue Place can refer to either:

 Fifth Avenue Place (Calgary), a skyscraper in Calgary, Canada
 Fifth Avenue Place (Pittsburgh) (also known as Highmark Place), a skyscraper in Pittsburgh, Pennsylvania

See also
Fifth Avenue (disambiguation)